Ad van Tiggelen (Maastricht, 7 June 1958) is an author of fantasy novels using the pen name Adrian Stone.

Career
Van Tiggelen studied business economics at the Erasmus University Rotterdam and in 1981 started his career at Nationale-Nederlanden, where he became investment manager in 1988. 
Since then he moved through a series of investment jobs at ING Groep, including a long period as head of European equities. In the end, he worked as investment strategist, in which function he regularly appeared in national and international media to comment on developments in the financial markets and to express and explain the vision of ING Investment Management. He ended his career with ING on 30 June 2014.

Columns
Van Tiggelen wrote columns every month about a series of investment topics. These columns appeared in the Netherlands in FD.nl and in various financial media in other countries: Belgium, France, Spain, Italy, Germany, Greece and Poland.

Author
Since his youth Van Tiggelen had a passion for fantasy literature, which led him to write fantasy novels himself.
In 2006 his first book Devil's Prophet appeared in a limited edition at Gopher publishers. In 2008 he signed a contract with Luitingh-Sijthoff, the Netherlands' largest publisher of speculative fiction and fantasy, on which basis Luitingh-Sijthoff re-published Devil's Prophet in April 2009, followed in June 2009 by Devil's Son.
The third part of the Devil trilogy, Devil's Soul, appeared in April 2010. All books are published under the pseudonym Adrian Stone.

After the Devil Trilogy Stone wrote the Rune Duology, which is situated in the same world. The first part The Eighth Rune was published in September 2011, the second part The First God in September 2012.

After Rune, Stone wrote a new series (title: Magycker), which plays in a completely new world. The first part The Claw was published in 2016. The second and final part Dragon Heart was published on 26 October 2021.

Early april 2023 a hardcover edition of the Devil Trilogy will be published.

He is the Netherlands' best selling fantasy author.

Bibliography Adrian Stone

Devil trilogy
 Devil's Prophet (Profeet van de Duivel) (2009)
 Devil's Son (Zoon van de Duivel) (2009)
 Devil's Soul (Ziel van de Duivel) (2010)
Rune duology
 The Eighth Rune (De Achtste Rune) (2011)
 The First God (De Eerste God) (2012)
Devil trilogy omnibus (2013)
Rune omnibus (2014)
Magycker series
 The Claw (De Klauw) (2016)
 Dragon Heart (Drakenhart) (2021)
 Devil trilogy hardcover (2023)

External links
  Adrian Stone, writer of fantasy books

References

1958 births
Living people
Dutch fantasy writers
Dutch bankers
Erasmus University Rotterdam alumni
Writers from Maastricht